Harwood Forest is a  conifer plantation located to the south of Rothbury in North Northumberland, England, and managed by Forestry England.

The forest was established over the course of the 20th century by the Forestry Commission (now Forestry England), which gradually purchased freehold or leasehold interest in farmland; at the start of the Commission's involvement, only  of the current site was forested, with the remaining lands being utilised for sheep and cattle grazing.

The initial impetus for its establishment was an offer made in 1929 by Sir Charles Trevelyan, 3rd Baronet to sell Harwood Farm to the commission at less than market rate. Trevelyan had inherited Wallington Hall and estate on the death of his father, the 2nd Baronet, in August 1928, and wished to see the estate forested; and although he determined on large-scale planting on other, retained, parts of the estate, he determined that it was reasonable to make arrangements with the commission to expedite his plan by transferring  to it. The farm forms the trapezoid southernmost section of the forest.

The next major acquisition was in 1950, when the Cragside estate of William Watson-Armstrong, 2nd Baron Armstrong, leased  to the commission, followed in 1951 by another , to form the Simonside section of the forest. This section is enclosed by the Simonside Hills, Simonside and Tosson Hill constraining the forest to a narrow neck-section, with additional forest to the north of Simonside. 

In the same year, 1951, the County Borough of Tyneside leased Chartners, a  farm to the south of the Simonside section, which covered the high watershed of Fontburn Reservoir, to the commission. Subsequent additions to the forest include Redpath farm, which joined the previously isolated Harwood farm area to Chartners and the Simonside section.

References

External links

Harwood Forest Plan, Forestry England

Forests and woodlands of Northumberland